Adonis Arms (born June 26, 1998) is an American professional basketball player for the Memphis Hustle of the NBA G League. He played college basketball for the Mesa CC Thunderbirds, Northwest Nazarene Nighthawks, Winthrop Eagles and Texas Tech Red Raiders.

High school career
Arms was raised in Milwaukee, Wisconsin, and moved to Phoenix, Arizona, at the age of 12. He attended Desert Vista High School where he failed to make the varsity team during his freshman, sophomore and junior seasons. Arms made the varsity team as a senior and averaged 2.7 points, 1.6 rebounds and .5 assists in 17 games. He received no college offers out of high school.

Arms was noticed by the son of Mesa Community College coach Sam Ballard while playing at open gyms. Ballard scouted Arms in an LA Fitness gym at the encouragement of his son and offered him a scholarship.

College career
Arms, who was  when he began playing at Mesa CC, averaged 8.1 points per game as a freshman. He transferred to join the Northwest Nazarene Nighthawks in NCAA Division II and averaged 20.6 points, 5.4 rebounds and 3.3 assists as he was named the Great Northwest Athletic Conference Player of the Year during the 2018–19 season.

Arms transferred to the Winthrop Eagles in NCAA Division I after his junior season. He had to sit out the 2019–20 season due to NCAA transfer rules. Arms averaged 10.3 points per game in a reserve role for the team during the 2020–21 season.

Arms elected to transfer to the Texas Tech Red Raiders for his final season of college eligibility. He chose the program due to his connection with associate head coach Barret Peery who he had first met as a freshman at Mesa CC. Arms averaged 8.6 points, 4.4 rebounds and 2.8 assists per game during the 2021–22 season.

Professional career
After going undrafted in the 2022 NBA draft, Arms played for the Denver Nuggets in the 2022 NBA Summer League. Arms was invited to join the Nuggets during their 2022 training camp. He was waived by the Nuggets on October 10, 2022. One day later, on October 11, 2022, Arms signed with the Phoenix Suns on a training camp deal. After not appearing in any preseason games, Arms was waived. On November 4, 2022, Arms was named on the roster of the Nuggets' NBA G League affiliate team, Grand Rapids Gold.

On February 25, 2023, Arms was traded to the Memphis Hustle.

Career statistics

College

|-
| style="text-align:left;"| 2020–21
| style="text-align:left;"| Winthrop
| 23 || 1 || 17.4 || .407 || .351 || .732 || 4.7 || 1.7 || .9 || .3 || 10.5
|-
| style="text-align:left;"| 2021–22
| style="text-align:left;"| Texas Tech
| 37 || 25 || 25.8 || .448 || .308 || .744 || 4.4 || 2.8 || 1.0 || .4 || 8.6
|- class="sortbottom"
| style="text-align:center;" colspan="2"| Career
| 60 || 26 || 22.6 || .431 || .326 || .738 || 4.5 || 2.4 || .9 || .3 || 9.3

References

External links
NBA G League profile
College statistics
Texas Tech Red Raiders bio
Winthrop Eagles bio
Northwest Nazarene Nighthawks bio
Mesa CC Thunderbirds bio

1998 births
Living people
American men's basketball players
Basketball players from Milwaukee
Basketball players from Phoenix, Arizona
Grand Rapids Gold players
Guards (basketball)
Memphis Hustle players
Mesa Thunderbirds men's basketball players
Northwest Nazarene University alumni
Texas Tech Red Raiders basketball players
Winthrop Eagles men's basketball players